Cornus volkensii is a species of tree in the family Cornaceae native to montane forests of eastern Africa, from South Sudan and Kenya south to Zimbabwe and Mozambique.

Description
Cornus volkensii is a small to medium-sized dioecious evergreen tree.

Range and habitat
Cornus volkensii is found in the mountains of eastern Africa, from South Sudan and Kenya through Uganda, the eastern Democratic Republic of the Congo, Rwanda, Burundi, Tanzania, and Malawi to Mozambique and Zimbabwe.

It is found in humid Afromontane forests, generally between 1,800 and 3,000 meters elevation, and occasionally as low as 1,200 meters elevation. It is often found along streams.

References 

volkensii
Afromontane flora
Albertine Rift montane forests
East African montane forests
Eastern Arc forests
Southern Rift montane forest–grassland mosaic
Flora of Burundi
Flora of the Democratic Republic of the Congo
Flora of Kenya
Flora of Mozambique
Flora of Rwanda
Flora of Tanzania
Flora of South Sudan
Flora of Uganda
Flora of Zimbabwe